The 2019 Austrian Grand Prix (formally known as the Formula 1 myWorld Großer Preis von Österreich 2019) was a Formula One motor race held on 30 June 2019 at the Red Bull Ring in Spielberg, Austria. The race was the 9th round of the 2019 FIA Formula One World Championship. The victory of Max Verstappen in the Red Bull Racing RB15 was the first win for a Honda-powered F1 car since Jenson Button in the 2006 Hungarian Grand Prix and he also became the first non-Mercedes driver to win a race in 2019.

Background

Championship standings before the race 
Heading into the race Lewis Hamilton had a 36-point advantage over teammate Valtteri Bottas in the Drivers' Championship. In the Constructors' Championship  Mercedes held a 140-point advantage over Ferrari.

Entrants

The drivers and teams entered were the same as those on the season entry list with no additional stand-in drivers for either the race or practice.

Penalties 
Prior to the start of the weekend Carlos Sainz Jr. and Alexander Albon exceeded their quotas for power unit components and were required to start from the back of the grid. Nico Hülkenberg and Kevin Magnussen received five-place grid penalties for exceeding their quota for power unit components and for a gearbox change, respectively.

Free practice 
Lewis Hamilton set the fastest time in first practice with Sebastian Vettel second. Valtteri Bottas was third ahead of Ferrari’s Charles Leclerc in fourth. Second practice was eventful as Vettel spun and both Bottas and Max Verstappen crashed. Leclerc was fastest ahead of Bottas, Pierre Gasly and Hamilton. In third practice Leclerc was fastest again ahead of Hamilton, Bottas and Vettel.

Qualifying

Qualifying classification 

Notes
  – Lewis Hamilton received a three-place grid penalty for impeding Kimi Räikkönen during qualifying. However, because of the way the penalties were applied, Hamilton dropped two places instead of three and he would start fourth.
  – Kevin Magnussen received a five-place grid penalty for an unscheduled gearbox change.
  – Nico Hülkenberg received a five-place grid penalty for exceeding his quota for power unit components. However, because of the way the penalties were applied, Hülkenberg dropped three places instead of five and he would start fifteenth.
  – Alexander Albon and Carlos Sainz Jr. were required to start from the back of the grid for exceeding their quotas for power unit components.
  – George Russell received a three-place grid penalty for impeding Daniil Kvyat during qualifying. Additionally, he was required to start from the pit lane for changing his front wing under parc fermé conditions.

Race

Race summary 
Whilst Charles Leclerc started the race well from pole position, Max Verstappen encountered an issue with his anti-stall, dropping from 2nd down to 8th place by turn 2. Lando Norris briefly battled Lewis Hamilton for 3rd place, and Kimi Räikkönen ran as high as 4th. Räikkönen held the position until lap 7, when he was passed by Sebastian Vettel, who had started 9th. By lap 9, Verstappen had recovered after his poor start, passing Räikkönen and Norris. Kevin Magnussen pitted on lap 12, dropping him to the back, but was handed a drive-through penalty soon afterwards after the stewards found he had over-stepped his grid line at the beginning of the race and started too far forward. He would only recover one place during the race, and eventually crossed the finish line in 19th.

Valtteri Bottas and Sebastian Vettel pitted on lap 22, with Bottas emerging in clear air in 4th, but with Vettel stuck behind Norris, Räikkönen and Pierre Gasly in 8th after a communication issue saw his pit-stop take longer than expected. Leclerc pitted on the following lap, handing the lead of the race to Hamilton. At this stage of the race, the Mercedes cars were suffering from the high air and track temperatures. Hamilton repeatedly ran wide at turn 1, driving over the sausage kerb. This eventually caused damage to his front wing, forcing him to pit for a replacement on lap 31 and dropping him to 5th place. Verstappen inherited the lead, but pitted on the following lap; Leclerc thus regained 1st place.

Verstappen emerged from the pits in 4th place, and began his charge towards the front. He passed Vettel on Lap 50, on the straight after turn 2. Vettel subsequently pitted on the following lap. Verstappen then passed Bottas into turn 2 on lap 56. Finally, he caught up with Leclerc at the front, passing him into turn 2 with three laps to go. On lap 69, Verstappen took a wide line through the corner on the inside of Leclerc, making contact and resulting in Leclerc leaving the track and driving over the kerb. Verstappen held on to his lead until the chequered flag, and the stewards later deemed his overtake legal. Vettel passed Hamilton on the final lap to take 4th place.

Verstappen's victory marked the first win for a Honda-powered F1 car since Jenson Button in the 2006 Hungarian Grand Prix. The race was also the first race in the season not to be won by a Mercedes driver, as Valtteri Bottas finished in third and Lewis Hamilton fifth. Antonio Giovinazzi scored his first ever career points in Formula One by finishing tenth place. This also marked the first race in which every driver saw the chequered flag since the 2016 Japanese Grand Prix.

Race classification 

Notes
  – Includes one point for fastest lap.

Championship standings after the race 

Drivers' Championship standings

Constructors' Championship standings

 Note: Only the top five positions are included for both sets of standings.

See also
 2019 Spielberg Formula 2 round
 2019 Spielberg Formula 3 round

References

External links

 Official event website

Austrian
Austrian Grand Prix
Grand Prix
Austrian Grand Prix